Heliamphora pulchella (Latin: pulchellus = pretty) is a species of marsh pitcher plant endemic to the Chimanta Massif and surrounding tepuis in Venezuela. It is one of the smallest species and closely related to H. minor.

Infraspecific taxa
Two major variants of H. pulchella are known: the type variety, which bears conspicuous retentive hairs on the inner pitcher surface, and an incompletely diagnosed taxon from Amurí Tepui, which lacks these hairs.

References

Further reading

  Brewer-Carías, C. (2012–2013).  Río Verde 9: 73–88.
  Fleischmann, A. & J.R. Grande Allende (2012) ['2011']. Taxonomía de Heliamphora minor Gleason (Sarraceniaceae) del Auyán-tepui, incluyendo una nueva variedad. [Taxonomy of Heliamphora minor Gleason (Sarraceniaceae) from Auyán-tepui, including a new variety.] Acta Botánica Venezuelica 34(1): 1–11.
Hingst, M. (2014). Amuri tepui part I. CPUK Forum, 3 April 2014. 
Hingst, M. (2014). Amuri tepui - Part II. CPUK Forum, 4 April 2014. 
Hingst, M. (2014). Amuri Part III - in search for Heliamphora. CPUK Forum, 11 April 2014. 
Hingst, M. (2014). Amuri Part IV - Heliamphora (uncinata, exappendiculata, pulchella 'black'). CPUK Forum, 12 April 2014. 
 McPherson, S. (2007). Pitcher Plants of the Americas. The McDonald & Woodward Publishing Company, Blacksburg, Virginia.
 Nerz, J. (December 2004). Heliamphora elongata (Sarraceniaceae), a new species from Ilu-Tepui. Carnivorous Plant Newsletter 33(4): 111–116.
 Nerz, J. & A. Wistuba (June 2006). Heliamphora exappendiculata, a clearly distinct species with unique characteristics. Carnivorous Plant Newsletter 35(2): 43–51.
 Nogué, S., V. Rull, E. Montoya, O. Huber & T. Vegas-Vilarrúbia (October 2009). Paleoecology of the Guayana Highlands (northern South America): Holocene pollen record from the Eruoda-tepui, in the Chimantá massif. Palaeogeography, Palaeoclimatology, Palaeoecology 281(1–2): 165–173. 
 Rull, V. (2009).  In: R.G. Gillespie & D.A. Clague (eds.) Encyclopedia of Islands. University of California Press, Berkeley. pp. 717–720.
 Wistuba, A., T. Carow & P. Harbarth (September 2002). Heliamphora chimantensis, a new species of Heliamphora (Sarraceniaceae) from the ‘Macizo de Chimanta’ in the south of Venezuela. Carnivorous Plant Newsletter 31(3): 78–82.

pulchella
Flora of Venezuela
Flora of the Tepuis